Alexa Denise Mariko Fujise (born July 17, 1954) is a judge of the Hawaii Intermediate Court of Appeals.

Education

Fuise received her bachelor's and law degrees from the University of Hawaii.

Legal and academic career

Fujise served as director of the Research and Reference Support Division of the Prosecutor's Office. She also served as appellate research branch chief and deputy prosecutor.

Fujise also served as an assistant disciplinary counsel for the Office of Disciplinary Counsel and as a law clerk for then-Associate Justice Herman Lum. She has taught appellate practice seminars for the National District Attorneys Association and the William S. Richardson School of Law.

Service on the Hawaii Intermediate Court of Appeals

Fujise was nominated to the court by former Governor Linda Lingle in March 2004 and assumed office on June 10, 2004.

Memberships and awards

Fujise has been on the Board of the William S. Richardson School of Law Alumni Association since 1980 and was the recipient of the Dean's Distinguished Alumni Award in 2005.

See also
List of Asian American jurists

References

External links

Official Biography on Court of Appeals website

Living people
1954 births
20th-century American women lawyers
20th-century American lawyers
21st-century American women lawyers
21st-century American lawyers
21st-century American judges
21st-century American women judges
American jurists of Asian descent
Hawaii lawyers
Hawaii state court judges
University of Hawaiʻi alumni